Diego Gabriel Chaves (born 7 April 1986) is an Argentine professional boxer who held the WBA interim welterweight title from 2012 to 2013.

Early life
Diego Chaves was born on 7 April 1986, in San Miguel, Argentina. Chaves had a stint as a football player in the junior divisions of Argentine club Velez Sársfield before dedicating his life to boxing. His grandfather, Rudecindo, was also a boxer who fought at middleweight in Argentina in the 1970s.

Before turning pro, Chaves represented Argentina in the 2007 Pan American Games where he won the bronze medal in the welterweight category. He also participated in the Americas qualifying tournament for the 2008 Summer Olympics but was eliminated.

Professional career
Chaves made his debut at the age of 22 on 5 July 2008, against fellow countryman Juan José Islas in the town of Castelli, Buenos Aires. Chaves won by knockout in the third round. After a string of victories on home soil, Chaves fought obtained the WBO Latino light middleweight after defeating Brazilian fighter Uilian Santana Barauna. Chaves made only one defense of this title before winning the vacant WBO Latino welterweight title against another boxer from Brazil, Daniel Saboia.

Around that time, Chaves had his first fight outside Argentina, winning a non-title fight by unanimous decision against Brazilian Edvan Dos Santos Barros at the Hard Rock Hotel and Casino in Paradise, Nevada, United States. Chaves then returned to Argentina, where he made five successful defenses of his WBO Latino welterweight belt before defeating French boxer Ismael El Massoudi to become WBA Interim Welterweight Champion on 21 July 2012. Since then, Chaves has successfully defended his Interim title once on 22 September 2012, defeating Panamanian boxer José Miranda by technical knockout in the second of twelve rounds.

Professional boxing record

References

External links
Professional boxing record for Diego Gabriel Chaves

World Boxing Association champions
Welterweight boxers
1986 births
Living people
Argentine male boxers
Pan American Games medalists in boxing
Pan American Games bronze medalists for Argentina
South American Games silver medalists for Argentina
South American Games medalists in boxing
Boxers at the 2007 Pan American Games
Competitors at the 2006 South American Games
Medalists at the 2007 Pan American Games